Silvia Nanda or her stage name Upiak Isil (born 24 December 1986) is a famous Indonesian singer, actress and female comedian. She populared from her single and MV Tak Tun Tuang, uploaded and released on social media in 2017 and populared around the Southeast Asia, especially Thailand and Malaysia.

She was born in Bukittinggi, West Sumatra on 24 December 1986 into a Minangkabau family, after that her family move to Pariaman, West Sumatra. She started to her career for 13 years old by populared artist in her ethnic. She very populared in her national by Minangkabau language pop singer.

In 2017, her music video Tak Tun Tuang make her on fame and populared around Southeast Asia. Tak Tun Tuang lyrics is from her lifestyle that look crazy and dirty but she ignored every cruise, because she has happy with her lifestyle. Tak Tung Tuang is so very popular in 3 years later that many singers have been covered it again, include Wonderframe (Thai singer), Aryanna Alyssa Dezek (Malaysian singer).

Discography

Studio Album 

 Malas Dedek Mah (Full Album)
 Harok Jo Padi Salibu
 Album Lawak Basilemak 3 Diva
 Emang Uda Sia (Full Album)
 Amris Arifin & Isil - Bahagia Bukan Harato (Album)
 Pudurkan Saja (Full Album)
 Upiak Isil - Kutang Barendo (Full Album)

Single 
 Tak Tun Tuang
 Kamera Palsu
 Halah Halahai
 Ketika Mantan Kayak Setan

Filmbiography

Film

References

External links 
 

1986 births
Living people
21st-century Indonesian women singers
Indonesian women comedians
Indonesian comedians
21st-century Indonesian actresses
Indonesian Muslims
People from Bukittinggi
Minangkabau people